Mites are microscopic arachnid animals.

Mite may also refer to:

Arts and entertainment 
Mite (album), 1988, by Chisato Moritaka
Mite (Dungeons & Dragons), a character in the role-playing games

Education 
Mangalore Institute of Technology & Engineering, Karnataka, India
Minority Introduction to Engineering and Science, a program at the Massachusetts Institute of Technology, U.S.

People 
Mite Cikarski, Macedonian footballer
Mite Kremnitz, German writer

Other uses 
River Mite, Cumbria, England
The Greek lepton, a small coin translated as "mite" in various passages of the Bible
Miniature Inverted-repeat Transposable Elements, non-self-replicating DNA strands
Mooney M-18 Mite, a 1947 model of one-man aircraft

See also
 Might (disambiguation)
 Mate (disambiguation)
 Meet (disambiguation)
 Mitre (disambiguation)
 Mitt (disambiguation)
 Tick (disambiguation)